The 1979 Tour of the Basque Country was the 19th edition of the Tour of the Basque Country cycle race and was held from 2 April to 6 April 1979. The race started in Tolosa and finished in Arantzazu. The race was won by Giovanni Battaglin.

General classification

References

1979
Bas